Hungary competed at the 2020 Summer Olympics in Tokyo. Originally scheduled to take place from 24 July to 9 August 2020, the Games were postponed to 23 July to 8 August 2021, because of the COVID-19 pandemic. Hungarian athletes have appeared in every edition of the Summer Olympic Games, except for two occasions. Hungary was not invited to the 1920 Summer Olympics in Antwerp, because of its role in the first World War, and was also part of the Soviet boycott, when Los Angeles hosted the 1984 Summer Olympics.

Medalists

The following Hungarian competitors won medals at the games. In the discipline sections below, the medalists' names are bolded.

|  style="text-align:left; width:78%; vertical-align:top;"|

|  style="text-align:left; width:22%; vertical-align:top;"|

Multiple medalists
The following competitors won multiple medals at the 2020 Olympic Games.

Competitors

| width=78% align=left valign=top |
The following is the list of number of competitors in the Games. Note that reserves in handball are not counted:

| width="22%" align="left" valign="top" |

Archery

One Hungarian archer directly qualified for the men's individual recurve at the Games by reaching the quarterfinal stage and obtaining one of seven available spots at the 2021 Final Qualification Tournament in Paris, France.

Athletics

Hungarian athletes further achieved the entry standards, either by qualifying time or by world ranking, in the following track and field events (up to a maximum of 3 athletes in each event):

Track & road events
Men

Women

Field events

Combined events – Women's heptathlon

Badminton

Hungary entered two badminton players (one per gender) into the Olympic tournament. Rio 2016 Olympian Laura Sárosi was selected to compete in the women's singles based on the BWF World Race to Tokyo Rankings. Gergely Krausz will compete in the men's singles after received reallocation quota.

Boxing

Hungary entered one male boxer into the Olympic tournament. Roland Gálos scored a round-of-16 victory to secure a spot in the men's featherweight division at the 2020 European Qualification Tournament in London, United Kingdom.

Canoeing

Sprint
Hungarian canoeists qualified six boats in each of the following distances for the Games through the 2019 ICF Canoe Sprint World Championships in Szeged. Meanwhile, two additional boats were awarded to the Hungarian canoeists each in the men's K-2 1000 m and women's C-2 1000 m, respectively, with their top-two placements at the 2021 European Canoe Sprint Qualification Regatta.

Men

Women

Qualification Legend: FA = Qualify to final (medal); FB = Qualify to final B (non-medal)

Cycling

Road
Hungary entered one rider to compete in the men's Olympic road race, by virtue of his top 50 national finish (for men) in the UCI World Ranking.

Mountain biking
Hungarian mountain bikers qualified for one men's and one women's quota place into the Olympic cross-country race, as a result of the nation's twentieth-place finish for men and nineteenth for women, respectively, in the UCI Olympic Ranking List of 16 May 2021.

Fencing

Hungarian fencers qualified a full squad in the men's team sabre at the Games, by finishing among the top four nations in the FIE Olympic Team Rankings, while the women's foil and women's sabre teams claimed the spot each as the highest-ranked nation from the European zone outside the world's top four. Meanwhile, Gergely Siklósi (men's épée) booked an additional spot on the Hungarian roster as one of the two highest-ranked fencers vying for qualification from Europe in the FIE Adjusted Official Rankings.

The fencing squad was officially named on May 28, 2021, with the two-time defending champion Áron Szilágyi in the men's sabre leading the fencers to his fourth consecutive Games.

Men

Women

Gymnastics

Artistic
Hungary entered one artistic gymnast into the Olympic competition. Rio 2016 Olympian Zsófia Kovács booked a spot in the women's individual all-around and apparatus events, by finishing sixth out of the twenty gymnasts eligible for qualification at the 2019 World Championships in Stuttgart, Germany.

Women

Rhythmic
Hungary qualified one rhythmic gymnast for the individual all-around at the 2021 European Championships in Varna, Bulgaria, signifying the country's return to the sporting scene since 2000.

Handball

Summary

Women's tournament

Hungary women's national handball team qualified for the Olympics by securing a top-two finish at the Győr leg of the 2020 IHF Olympic Qualification Tournament.

Team roster

Group play

Quarterfinal

Judo
 
Hungary entered seven judoka (three men and four women) into the Olympic tournament based on the International Judo Federation Olympics Individual Ranking.

Men

Women

Karate
 
Hungary entered one karateka into the inaugural Olympic tournament. Gábor Hárspataki qualified directly for the men's kumite 75 kg category by finishing third in the final pool round at the 2021 World Olympic Qualification Tournament in Paris, France.

Modern pentathlon
 
Hungarian athletes qualified for the following spots in the modern pentathlon at the Games. Two-time Olympian Sarolta Kovács confirmed a place in the women's event by finishing eighth among those eligible for Olympic qualification at the 2019 European Championships in Bath, England. London 2012 bronze medalist Ádám Marosi reclaimed the individual title to secure a men's place for the Hungarians at the 2021 UIPM World Championships in Cairo, Egypt, with Michelle Gulyás locking the podium with a bronze on the women's side. Róbert Kasza accepted a spare berth previously allocated by Bence Demeter as the nation's next highest-ranked modern pentathlete based on the UIPM World Rankings.

Rowing

Hungary qualified one boat in the men's single sculls for the Games by winning the bronze medal and securing the second of three berths available at the 2021 FISA European Olympic Qualification Regatta in Varese, Italy.

Qualification Legend: FA=Final A (medal); FB=Final B (non-medal); FC=Final C (non-medal); FD=Final D (non-medal); FE=Final E (non-medal); FF=Final F (non-medal); SA/B=Semifinals A/B; SC/D=Semifinals C/D; SE/F=Semifinals E/F; QF=Quarterfinals; R=Repechage

Sailing

Hungarian sailors qualified one boat in each of the following classes through the 2018 Sailing World Championships, the class-associated Worlds, and the continental regattas.

M = Medal race; EL = Eliminated – did not advance into the medal race

Shooting

Hungarian shooters achieved quota places for the following events by virtue of their best finishes at the 2018 ISSF World Championships, the 2019 ISSF World Cup series, European Championships or Games, and European Qualifying Tournament, as long as they obtained a minimum qualifying score (MQS) by May 31, 2020. The shooting squad was named on June 14, 2021, with 2018 world silver medalist and current world record holder István Péni earning his second consecutive trip to the Games as the lone returning Olympian.

Swimming 

Hungarian swimmers further achieved qualifying standards in the following events (up to a maximum of 2 swimmers in each event at the Olympic Qualifying Time (OQT), and potentially 1 at the Olympic Selection Time (OST)):

Thirty-three swimmers (22 men and 11 women) were named to the Hungarian roster for the Olympics at the end of the qualifying window, with six-time medalist László Cseh, freestylers Zsuzsanna Jakabos and Evelyn Verrasztó, and two-time defending individual medley champion Katinka Hosszú racing in the pool at their fifth straight Games.

Men

Women

Mixed

 Swimmers who participated in the heats only.

Table tennis

Hungary entered five athletes into the table tennis competition at the Games. For the first time in history, the women's team secured a berth by advancing to the quarterfinal round of the 2020 World Olympic Qualification Event in Gondomar, Portugal, permitting a maximum of two starters to compete in the women's singles tournament. Meanwhile, Bence Majoros scored a second-match final triumph to book one of the four available places in the men's singles at the 2021 ITTF World Qualification Tournament in Doha, Qatar. Moreover, the last open berth in the inaugural mixed doubles was awarded to the Hungarian table tennis players, as the next highest-ranked pair vying for qualification in the ITTF World Rankings of June 1, 2021.

Taekwondo

For the first time since 2000, Hungary entered one athlete into the taekwondo competition at the Games. American-born Omar Salim secured a spot in the men's flyweight category (58 kg) with a top two finish at the 2021 European Qualification Tournament in Sofia, Bulgaria.

Tennis
Hungary named a team of three players on 10 June 2021. Timea Babos withdrew ahead of the tournament, with Márton Fucsovics joining her before his initial scheduled match against Poland's Hubert Hurkacz because of a right shoulder injury.

Triathlon

Hungary confirmed four quota places (two per gender) in the triathlon events for the rescheduled Tokyo, after finishing among the top seven nations vying for qualification in the ITU Mixed Relay Olympic Rankings.

Individual

Relay

Water polo

Summary

Men's tournament
 
Hungary men's national water polo team qualified for the Olympics by advancing to the final match and securing an outright berth at the 2020 European Championships in Budapest.

Team roster

Group play

Quarterfinal

Semifinal

Bronze medal game

Women's tournament
 
Hungary women's national water polo team qualified for the Olympics by advancing to the final match and securing an outright berth at the 2020 World Olympic Qualification Tournament in Trieste, Italy.

Team roster

Group play

Quarterfinal

Semifinal

Bronze medal game

Weightlifting

Hungary entered one male weightlifter into the Olympic competition. Two-time Olympian Péter Nagy accepted a spare berth unused by Africa as the next highest-ranked weightlifter vying for qualification in the men's +109 kg category based on the IWF Absolute World Rankings.

Wrestling

Hungary qualified six wrestlers for each of the following classes into the Olympic competition. Four of them finished among the top six to book Olympic spots in the men's freestyle 65 kg, men's Greco-Roman (77 and 87 kg), and women's freestyle 62 kg wrestling at the 2019 World Championships, while an additional license was awarded to the Hungarian wrestler, who progressed to the top two finals of the men's Greco-Roman 67 kg at the 2021 European Olympic Qualification Tournament in Budapest. Another Hungarian wrestler claimed one of the remaining slots each in the men's Greco-Roman 97 kg, respectively, to complete the nation's roster at the 2021 World Qualification Tournament in Sofia, Bulgaria.

Freestyle

Greco-Roman

References

Nations at the 2020 Summer Olympics
2020
2021 in Hungarian sport